The 1988–89 New York Rangers season was the franchise's 63rd season. The team returned to the playoffs for the 11th time in 12 seasons. A major storyline of the season was Guy Lafleur's comeback from retirement.

Regular season

Guy Lafleur 
After being inducted into the Hockey Hall of Fame, Guy Lafleur returned to the NHL during the 1988–89 season with the New York Rangers. Lafleur remained one of the few players that did not wear protective helmets due to the Grandfather clause. A highlight of Lafleur's season was the opportunity to be on the same team with Marcel Dionne. During his first game back in the Montreal Forum, he scored twice against Patrick Roy during the Rangers' 7–5 loss to the Canadiens. Although his high-scoring days were well behind him, his stint with the Rangers was moderately successful and he helped the team to first place in the Patrick Division until being knocked out by a knee injury. The Rangers would finish the season in third place.

Season standings

Schedule and results 

|- align="center" bgcolor="white"
| 1 || 6 || @ Chicago Blackhawks || 2 - 2 OT || 0-0-1
|- align="center" bgcolor="#CCFFCC"
| 2 || 8 || @ St. Louis Blues || 4 - 2 || 1-0-1
|- align="center" bgcolor="#FFBBBB"
| 3 || 10 || New Jersey Devils || 5 - 0 || 1-1-1
|- align="center" bgcolor="#FFBBBB"
| 4 || 12 || Hartford Whalers || 4 - 3 || 1-2-1
|- align="center" bgcolor="#CCFFCC"
| 5 || 16 || Vancouver Canucks || 3 - 2 || 2-2-1
|- align="center" bgcolor="#CCFFCC"
| 6 || 19 || Washington Capitals || 5 - 1 || 3-2-1
|- align="center" bgcolor="#CCFFCC"
| 7 || 21 || @ Washington Capitals || 4 - 1 || 4-2-1
|- align="center" bgcolor="#CCFFCC"
| 8 || 23 || Quebec Nordiques || 8 - 2 || 5-2-1
|- align="center" bgcolor="#CCFFCC"
| 9 || 26 || Philadelphia Flyers || 4 - 3 || 6-2-1
|- align="center" bgcolor="#CCFFCC"
| 10 || 29 || @ Philadelphia Flyers || 6 - 5 || 7-2-1
|- align="center" bgcolor="#CCFFCC"
| 11 || 30 || Pittsburgh Penguins || 9 - 2 || 8-2-1
|-

|- align="center" bgcolor="#FFBBBB"
| 12 || 2 || @ Buffalo Sabres || 6 - 4 || 8-3-1
|- align="center" bgcolor="#FFBBBB"
| 13 || 6 || @ New Jersey Devils || 6 - 5 || 8-4-1
|- align="center" bgcolor="#FFBBBB"
| 14 || 8 || @ New York Islanders || 4 - 3 || 8-5-1
|- align="center" bgcolor="#CCFFCC"
| 15 || 9 || Philadelphia Flyers || 5 - 3 || 9-5-1
|- align="center" bgcolor="white"
| 16 || 11 || Boston Bruins || 4 - 4 OT || 9-5-2
|- align="center" bgcolor="#FFBBBB"
| 17 || 13 || Detroit Red Wings || 5 - 3 || 9-6-2
|- align="center" bgcolor="white"
| 18 || 15 || @ Philadelphia Flyers || 3 - 3 OT || 9-6-3
|- align="center" bgcolor="#CCFFCC"
| 19 || 17 || @ Los Angeles Kings || 6 - 5 || 10-6-3
|- align="center" bgcolor="#CCFFCC"
| 20 || 19 || @ Minnesota North Stars || 4 - 1 || 11-6-3
|- align="center" bgcolor="#FFBBBB"
| 21 || 21 || Montreal Canadiens || 4 - 2 || 11-7-3
|- align="center" bgcolor="#FFBBBB"
| 22 || 23 || @ Pittsburgh Penguins || 8 - 2 || 11-8-3
|- align="center" bgcolor="#CCFFCC"
| 23 || 26 || @ New York Islanders || 6 - 4 || 12-8-3
|- align="center" bgcolor="#CCFFCC"
| 24 || 27 || New York Islanders || 5 - 3 || 13-8-3
|- align="center" bgcolor="#CCFFCC"
| 25 || 29 || @ Winnipeg Jets || 4 - 3 || 14-8-3
|-

|- align="center" bgcolor="#FFBBBB"
| 26 || 1 || @ Calgary Flames || 6 - 3 || 14-9-3
|- align="center" bgcolor="#FFBBBB"
| 27 || 4 || @ Edmonton Oilers || 10 - 6 || 14-10-3
|- align="center" bgcolor="#CCFFCC"
| 28 || 6 || @ Vancouver Canucks || 5 - 3 || 15-10-3
|- align="center" bgcolor="#FFBBBB"
| 29 || 8 || @ Hartford Whalers || 5 - 4 || 15-11-3
|- align="center" bgcolor="white"
| 30 || 10 || @ Boston Bruins || 1 - 1 OT || 15-11-4
|- align="center" bgcolor="#FFBBBB"
| 31 || 12 || Los Angeles Kings || 5 - 2 || 15-12-4
|- align="center" bgcolor="#CCFFCC"
| 32 || 14 || New York Islanders || 2 - 1 || 16-12-4
|- align="center" bgcolor="#FFBBBB"
| 33 || 17 || @ Montreal Canadiens || 6 - 3 || 16-13-4
|- align="center" bgcolor="#CCFFCC"
| 34 || 19 || Washington Capitals || 3 - 1 || 17-13-4
|- align="center" bgcolor="#FFBBBB"
| 35 || 21 || Buffalo Sabres || 5 - 2 || 17-14-4
|- align="center" bgcolor="white"
| 36 || 23 || @ Washington Capitals || 2 - 2 OT || 17-14-5
|- align="center" bgcolor="#CCFFCC"
| 37 || 26 || New Jersey Devils || 5 - 1 || 18-14-5
|- align="center" bgcolor="#CCFFCC"
| 38 || 27 || @ New Jersey Devils || 7 - 5 || 19-14-5
|- align="center" bgcolor="#CCFFCC"
| 39 || 31 || Chicago Blackhawks || 4 - 1 || 20-14-5
|-

|- align="center" bgcolor="#CCFFCC"
| 40 || 2 || Hartford Whalers || 5 - 4 || 21-14-5
|- align="center" bgcolor="white"
| 41 || 4 || Washington Capitals || 3 - 3 OT || 21-14-6
|- align="center" bgcolor="#CCFFCC"
| 42 || 7 || @ New York Islanders || 5 - 1 || 22-14-6
|- align="center" bgcolor="#FFBBBB"
| 43 || 9 || New Jersey Devils || 5 - 4 || 22-15-6
|- align="center" bgcolor="white"
| 44 || 14 || @ Pittsburgh Penguins || 4 - 4 OT || 22-15-7
|- align="center" bgcolor="#CCFFCC"
| 45 || 15 || Pittsburgh Penguins || 6 - 4 || 23-15-7
|- align="center" bgcolor="#CCFFCC"
| 46 || 18 || @ Chicago Blackhawks || 6 - 4 || 24-15-7
|- align="center" bgcolor="#CCFFCC"
| 47 || 19 || @ St. Louis Blues || 5 - 0 || 25-15-7
|- align="center" bgcolor="#CCFFCC"
| 48 || 21 || @ Vancouver Canucks || 5 - 4 OT || 26-15-7
|- align="center" bgcolor="#CCFFCC"
| 49 || 23 || @ Edmonton Oilers || 3 - 2 || 27-15-7
|- align="center" bgcolor="#FFBBBB"
| 50 || 26 || @ Calgary Flames || 5 - 3 || 27-16-7
|- align="center" bgcolor="white"
| 51 || 28 || @ Toronto Maple Leafs || 1 - 1 OT || 27-16-8
|- align="center" bgcolor="#CCFFCC"
| 52 || 30 || New York Islanders || 7 - 3 || 28-16-8
|-

|- align="center" bgcolor="#FFBBBB"
| 53 || 1 || Washington Capitals || 4 - 3 OT || 28-17-8
|- align="center" bgcolor="#FFBBBB"
| 54 || 4 || @ Montreal Canadiens || 7 - 5 || 28-18-8
|- align="center" bgcolor="#FFBBBB"
| 55 || 5 || Minnesota North Stars || 5 - 3 || 28-19-8
|- align="center" bgcolor="#CCFFCC"
| 56 || 9 || Winnipeg Jets || 4 - 3 || 29-19-8
|- align="center" bgcolor="#FFBBBB"
| 57 || 12 || Edmonton Oilers || 3 - 1 || 29-20-8
|- align="center" bgcolor="#FFBBBB"
| 58 || 14 || @ Philadelphia Flyers || 3 - 1 || 29-21-8
|- align="center" bgcolor="#FFBBBB"
| 59 || 17 || Toronto Maple Leafs || 10 - 6 || 29-22-8
|- align="center" bgcolor="#CCFFCC"
| 60 || 18 || @ Pittsburgh Penguins || 5 - 3 || 30-22-8
|- align="center" bgcolor="#CCFFCC"
| 61 || 20 || New Jersey Devils || 7 - 4 || 31-22-8
|- align="center" bgcolor="#FFBBBB"
| 62 || 22 || Philadelphia Flyers || 6 - 4 || 31-23-8
|- align="center" bgcolor="#CCFFCC"
| 63 || 25 || @ Quebec Nordiques || 7 - 2 || 32-23-8
|- align="center" bgcolor="#CCFFCC"
| 64 || 27 || Los Angeles Kings || 6 - 4 || 33-23-8
|-

|- align="center" bgcolor="#CCFFCC"
| 65 || 1 || Toronto Maple Leafs || 7 - 4 || 34-23-8
|- align="center" bgcolor="#FFBBBB"
| 66 || 3 || @ New Jersey Devils || 6 - 3 || 34-24-8
|- align="center" bgcolor="#FFBBBB"
| 67 || 5 || Boston Bruins || 5 - 0 || 34-25-8
|- align="center" bgcolor="#FFBBBB"
| 68 || 8 || Buffalo Sabres || 2 - 0 || 34-26-8
|- align="center" bgcolor="#FFBBBB"
| 69 || 9 || @ Detroit Red Wings || 3 - 2 || 34-27-8
|- align="center" bgcolor="#FFBBBB"
| 70 || 11 || @ Washington Capitals || 4 - 2 || 34-28-8
|- align="center" bgcolor="#CCFFCC"
| 71 || 13 || Calgary Flames || 4 - 3 || 35-28-8
|- align="center" bgcolor="#FFBBBB"
| 72 || 15 || Winnipeg Jets || 6 - 3 || 35-29-8
|- align="center" bgcolor="#FFBBBB"
| 73 || 18 || @ Quebec Nordiques || 8 - 3 || 35-30-8
|- align="center" bgcolor="#CCFFCC"
| 74 || 20 || St. Louis Blues || 7 - 4 || 36-30-8
|- align="center" bgcolor="#CCFFCC"
| 75 || 22 || Minnesota North Stars || 3 - 1 || 37-30-8
|- align="center" bgcolor="#FFBBBB"
| 76 || 25 || @ Philadelphia Flyers || 6 - 1 || 37-31-8
|- align="center" bgcolor="#FFBBBB"
| 77 || 26 || Pittsburgh Penguins || 6 - 4 || 37-32-8
|- align="center" bgcolor="#FFBBBB"
| 78 || 29 || @ Detroit Red Wings || 4 - 3 || 37-33-8
|-

|- align="center" bgcolor="#FFBBBB"
| 79 || 1 || @ Pittsburgh Penguins || 5 - 2 || 37-34-8
|- align="center" bgcolor="#FFBBBB"
| 80 || 2 || New York Islanders || 6 - 4 || 37-35-8
|-

Playoffs 

Key:  Win  Loss

Player statistics 
Skaters

Goaltenders

†Denotes player spent time with another team before joining Rangers. Stats reflect time with Rangers only.
‡Traded mid-season. Stats reflect time with Rangers only.

Draft picks 
New York's picks at the 1988 NHL Entry Draft in Montreal, Quebec, Canada at the Montreal Forum.

Supplemental Draft 
New York's picks at the 1988 NHL Supplemental Draft.

Awards and records 
 Brian Leetch, Calder Memorial Trophy
 Brian Leetch, Most Goals by a Rookie Defenseman in One Season (23)
 Most goals by rookie, season - Tony Granato (1988–89) - 36

References

External links
 Rangers on Hockey Database
 

New York Rangers seasons
New York Rangers
New York Rangers
New York Rangers
New York Rangers
1980s in Manhattan
Madison Square Garden